Lode Heath School is an Academy secondary school in the Lode Heath district of Solihull, West Midlands, England.

It is situated approximately 1 mile north of Solihull town centre off the B425 towards Sheldon, Birmingham.

History 
The school first opened in 1939 and was the base from which a number of other Solihull schools were started. In September 2011, LHS converted to become an Academy.

Ofsted judgements
As of 2022, the school's last full inspection by Ofsted was in 2019, with a judgement of Good.

References

External links
School website

1939 establishments in England
Academies in Solihull
Educational institutions established in 1939
Secondary schools in Solihull